Richetti, Ricchetti may refer to :
 Joseph Shalit Riqueti (Richetti), a Jewish-Italian scholar

Ricchetti 

 Alberto Ricchetti (born 1985), an Italian sprint canoer
 Pablo Ricchetti (born 1977, Buenos Aires), an Argentine soccer midfielder
 Steve Ricchetti, the founder and President of Richetti, Inc.

Italian-language surnames
Jewish surnames
Sephardic surnames